The Sacred Flame (German: Die heilige Flamme) is a lost 1931 American drama film directed by William Dieterle and Berthold Viertel and starring Gustav Fröhlich, Dita Parlo and Hans Heinrich von Twardowski. It was made by Warner Brothers as a German-language remake of the studio's 1929 film The Sacred Flame. It is based upon the 1928 play of the same name by W. Somerset Maugham.

Synopsis
After newly married Stella's husband is badly injured in a plane crash, causing him to lose the use of his legs, she becomes emotionally involved with his brother.

Reception
Rudolf Arnheim said "It is incomprehensible how such a film can be launched in a large cinema, rather than being chastely hidden away from the eyes of any kind of criticism."

Cast
 Gustav Fröhlich as Walter Taylor
 Dita Parlo as Stella
 Hans Heinrich von Twardowski as Robert Taylor
 Salka Viertel as Frau Taylor
 Charlotte Hagenbruch  as Schwester Weyland
 Vladimir Sokoloff as Doctor Harvester
 Anton Pointner as Major Liconda
 Hubert von Meyerinck as Pfarrer

References

External links

1931 films
1931 drama films
American drama films
Warner Bros. films
1930s German-language films
Films based on works by W. Somerset Maugham
Films directed by William Dieterle
Films directed by Berthold Viertel
American multilingual films
Remakes of American films
Films with screenplays by Berthold Viertel
Lost American films
American black-and-white films
1931 multilingual films
Films set in London
1931 lost films
Lost drama films
1930s American films